The Cessna 408 SkyCourier is an American  utility aircraft designed and built by Textron Aviation.

It was launched on November 28, 2017, with an order for 50 from FedEx Express.
It made its first flight on May 17, 2020, and was type certified on March 11, 2022. FedEx took delivery of the first production model on May 9, 2022.

The SkyCourier is a twin-turboprop, high-wing aircraft, available with a 19-passenger accommodation, or in a cargo variant sized for three LD3s.
The non-pressurized design is built from aluminum and is equipped with Pratt & Whitney Canada PT6A engines and fixed landing gear. 

Development

The Model 408 was launched on November 28, 2017, by Textron Aviation, with an introduction planned for 2020, as a FAR Part 23 type certified design. The 408's design was developed to match FedEx Express requirements, like the earlier Cessna 208 Caravan. FedEx Express will be the launch customer, with an order of "50 cargo aircraft and options for 50 more".
Its unit cost then was $5.5 million.

Initial wind tunnel tests were completed in March 2018. The first flight was originally planned for 2019 and first deliveries anticipated in 2020. FedEx initially planned to take monthly deliveries over four years starting in 2020, and a similar pace for a second batch, if it agrees to that option.
A full-scale mockup of the 19-passenger cabin was displayed at the October 2018 National Business Aviation Association convention.

The mating of the wing and fuselage of the first aircraft was completed in December 2019.

By March 2020, initial ground testing was completed, checking the fuel system, engines, avionics interfaces and electrical systems. The first flight was completed on May 17, 2020, operating from Beech Factory Airport for a 2-hour and 15-minute flight. The prototype aircraft, along with five additional flight and ground test articles, will be used for testing leading to certification. The second prototype first flew in August 2020. It is the first production-conforming aircraft and will be used for testing the engines, propellers, environmental controls and the avionics. A third test aircraft first flew in September 2020.

In 2021, its equipped price was $6.85M for the freighter and $7.375M for the passenger version. In April 2021, the company anticipated that certification would be completed by year's end and initial deliveries would occur in spring/summer 2022.
The SkyCourier made its first public appearance at the EAA AirVenture in Oshkosh in 2021.

By early 2022, the three test aircraft had accumulated over 2,100 flight hours as the first production aircraft for FedEx was rolled out on February 3, 2022. Cessna was aiming for certification in the first half of the year before first delivery later in 2022. Federal Aviation Administration type certification was granted on March 11, 2022, after 2,100 hours of flight tests.

The first production aircraft was delivered to FedEx Express in May 2022.

In February 2023, a gravel runway operations kit was approved for the aircraft.

Design

The SkyCourier is a twin-turboprop, high-wing, utility aircraft.
Single-point refueling will speed turnarounds.

The clean-sheet design should offer better cabin flexibility and payload capability, superior performance and lower operating costs than its competitors.
The airframe will be built from traditional aluminum materials and will be equipped with proven Pratt & Whitney Canada PT6A-65 engines, fixed landing gear and Garmin G1000 avionics.

Operators
FedEx Express - 50 on order, one delivered as of July 2022
Aerus - two on order as of December 2022

Specifications

See also

References

External links

 

SkyCourier
Proposed aircraft of the United States
T-tail aircraft
High-wing aircraft
Twin-turboprop tractor aircraft
Aircraft first flown in 2020